Corporal Sidney James Day VC (3 July 1891 – 17 July 1959) was an English recipient of the Victoria Cross, the highest and most prestigious award for gallantry in the face of the enemy that can be awarded to a British or Commonwealth serviceman.

While serving as a corporal in the 11th (Service) Battalion, Suffolk Regiment, British Army during the First World War, he was seriously wounded during the Battle of the Somme and invalided back to England, spending several months in hospital. Upon discharge, he returned to duty in Northern France.

On 26 August 1917, east of Hargicourt, France, Day was in command of a bombing section detailed to clear a maze of trenches still held by the enemy; this he did, killing two machine gunners and taking four prisoners. Immediately after he returned to his section, a stick bomb fell into a trench occupied by five men, one badly wounded. The corporal seized the bomb and threw it over the trench where it immediately exploded. He afterwards completed the clearing of the trench and established himself in an advanced position, remaining for 66 hours at his post, which came under intense fire.

Death
He died in Queen Alexandra's Hospital on 17 July 1959 and is buried in Milton Cemetery, Portsmouth.

References

1891 births
1959 deaths
Burials in Hampshire
Military personnel from Norwich
Suffolk Regiment soldiers
British Army personnel of World War I
British World War I recipients of the Victoria Cross
British Army recipients of the Victoria Cross